MV Alta is an abandoned merchant vessel currently located in Ireland. Constructed in 1976 with the name Tananger, Alta was abandoned at sea in October 2018 and washed ashore in Ireland in February 2020, where her wreckage remains.

Career 
Alta was constructed in 1976 as the Tananger, and has had several other names before becoming the Alta in 2017. By 2015, she was equipped with an Automatic Identification System (AIS) which allowed her movements to be tracked. She periodically switched the AIS on and off as she mostly travelled around the Mediterranean Sea. Deactivating the AIS is unusual, as is the numerous name changes the ship had in her later years, which can indicate involvement in illegal activity.

Abandonment 
In October 2018, the ship was on a voyage from Greece to Haiti. Such a long trip is unusual for a ship of this type and size, which typically stays closer to shorelines. The ship’s engines failed in the Atlantic Ocean, leaving the crew stranded.

After her abandonment, the ship's next moves are uncertain. An unverified report suggested that she was towed to Guyana and possibly hijacked, only to be abandoned a second time. After this sighting, she likely continued to drift at very low speeds before eventually arriving in Ireland. However, the AIS was not functioning after her abandonment, making her course uncertain.

Wreckage 
On 16 February 2020, the Alta ran aground on the Irish coast near Ballycotton, Cork amid Storm Dennis. The rare story of a modern day ghost ship, as well as the length of time it spent floating without crew or captain at sea (18 months), caught the global public's imagination and curiosity.

The responsibility of the wreck fell to Irish Minister for the Marine as per the Salvage and Wreck Act 1993, until such time as a receiver of wreck be appointed. Despite efforts to determine the ownership of the ship—so that the Irish state can try to recover costs incurred— ownership had not been established. Although the ship's commercial scrap value is "low," the cost to the Irish exchequer of removing the wreck could exceed €10 millions. Alta had previously been the subject of an ownership dispute, with claims she was once hijacked and towed to Guyana, but efforts have been made to establish where she was last registered. Some reports suggest the ship was sailing under a Panamanian flag when her crew were rescued and she was abandoned in October 2018, while other reports suggest she was registered in Tanzania. Sixty-two full barrels of oil were ultimately removed from the wreck by helicopter. Afterwards, the ship was sealed off and made inaccessible.

By October 2020, the wreckage had deteriorated to the point that the Cork County Council feared that the ship would break apart. The County has requested assistance from other departments of the Irish government in removing the ship. Three options are under consideration for the wreckage: to leave the ship in place, to tow her out to sea and let her sink, or to dismantle and scrap her. By 13 March 2022, following a series of storms and poor weather, the hull of Alta was split in two.

References

1976 ships
Cargo ships of Panama
Maritime incidents in 2018
Maritime incidents in 2020
Shipwrecks of Ireland
Ghost ships